KLIA Outer Ring Road (KLIAORR), or Jalan Pekeliling, Federal Route 27, is the second highway and ring road along Kuala Lumpur International Airport (KLIA) after KLIA Expressway (Federal Route 26) in Malaysia. During Formula One Petronas Malaysian Grand Prix championship every year it becomes the main route to Sepang F1 Circuit. From 1 March 2006 until 9 May 2014 it became a main road to Low Cost Carrier Terminal (LCCT).

The Kilometre Zero is located at KLIA Expressway Interchange.

Features
At most sections, the Federal Route 27 was built under the JKR R5 road standard, allowing maximum speed limit of up to 90 km/h.

There are no overlaps, alternate routes, or sections with motorcycle lanes.

List of interchange

References

See also
 KLIA Expressway
 Jalan KLIA 1
 North–South Expressway Central Link
 Kuala Lumpur International Airport (KLIA)

Ring roads in Malaysia
Highways in Malaysia
Expressways and highways in the Klang Valley
Roads in Selangor